Hilly may refer to:

 a place with hills
 a place with hill country

People

Surname
 Francis Billy Hilly (born 1948), Solomon Islands politician
 Jed Hilly, American musician
 Pat Hilly (1887–1953), American baseball player

Given name
 Hilly Bardwell, wife of Alastair Boyd, 7th Baron Kilmarnock
 Hilly Elkins (1929–2010), American producer
 Hilly Flitcraft (1923–2003), American baseball player
 Hilly Hathaway (born 1969), American baseball player
 Hilly Hicks Sr. (born 1950), American actor
 Hilly Hicks Jr. (born 1970), American playwright and screenwriter
 Hilly Kristal (1931–2007), American musician and club owner
 Hilly Michaels, American musician
 Hilly Rose, American radio personality

Other uses
 Hilly Creek, a creek in Halifax County, Virginia, U.S.

See also

 
 Hillier (disambiguation)
 Hillies (disambiguation)
 Hillyer (disambiguation)
 Hillyfields (disambiguation), including Hilly Field(s)
 Hill (disambiguation)